Paranomus centaureoides, the Ladismith sceptre, is a flower-bearing shrub that belongs to the genus Paranomus and forms part of the fynbos. The plant is native to the Western Cape, South Africa.

Description
Fire destroys the plant but the seeds survive. The plant is bisexual and pollinated by insects. The fruit ripens two months after flowering, and the seeds fall to the ground where they are spread by ants.

Distribution and habitat
The plant occurs in the Swartberg between Ladismith and Seweweekspoort.

References

External links

centaureoides